The 2017 Lethbridge municipal election was held Monday, October 17, 2017 to elect a mayor and eight councillors (at-large), the seven Lethbridge School District No. 51 trustees, and five of the Holy Spirit Roman Catholic Separate Regional Division No. 4’s nine trustees (as Ward 2).

From 1968 to 2013, provincial legislation has required every municipality to hold elections every three years. The Legislative Assembly of Alberta passed a bill on December 5, 2012, amending the Local Authorities Election Act. Starting with the 2013 elections, officials are elected for a four-year term, and municipal elections are moved to a four-year cycle. Of the 78,772 eligible voters, only 21,338 turned in a ballot, a voter turnout of 27%.

Results 
Bold indicates elected, and incumbents are italicized.

78,772 eligible voters

21,357 voted

Voter turn-out: 27 percent

Mayor

Councillors 
The use of Block Voting meant that each voter could cast up to 8 votes. Thus there was a far greater number of votes than voters. 21,000 voters cast 128,000 votes.

(Percentage means candidate received a vote from that portion of voters.)

References 

Municipal elections in Lethbridge